Pygmaeconus wallacei is a species of sea snail, a marine gastropod mollusk in the family Conidae, the cone snails and their allies.

Like all species within the genus Conus, these snails are predatory and venomous. They are capable of "stinging" humans.

Description
The length of the shell attains 6 mm.

Distribution
This marine species occurs off Sulawesi, Indonesia.

References

 
 Lorenz, F. and Morrison, H. 2004b. The genus Lilliconus G. Raybaudi Massilia (Gastropoda: Conidae) in the Western Pacific, with the description of Lilliconus wallacei sp. nov. Schriften zur Malakozoologie 21:29–34.
 Filmer R.M. (2001). A Catalogue of Nomenclature and Taxonomy in the Living Conidae 1758–1998. Backhuys Publishers, Leiden. 388pp.

External links
 The Conus Biodiversity website
 
 
 

wallacei
Gastropods described in 2004